
Gmina Hrubieszów is a rural gmina (administrative district) in Hrubieszów County, Lublin Voivodeship, in eastern Poland, on the border with Ukraine. Its seat is the town of Hrubieszów, although the town is not part of the territory of the gmina.

The gmina contains part of the protected area called Strzelce Landscape Park.

Villages
Gmina Hrubieszów contains the villages and settlements of Annopol, Białoskóry, Brodzica, Cichobórz, Czerniczyn, Czortowice, Czumów, Dąbrowa, Dziekanów, Gródek, Husynne, Janki, Kobło, Kosmów, Kozodawy, Kułakowice Drugie, Kułakowice Pierwsze, Kułakowice Trzecie, Łotoszyny, Masłomęcz, Metelin, Mieniany, Moniatycze, Moniatycze-Kolonia, Moroczyn, Nowosiółki, Obrowiec, Ślipcze, Stefankowice, Stefankowice-Kolonia, Świerszczów, Szpikołosy, Teptiuków, Turkołówka, Ubrodowice, Wołajowice, Wolica and Wołynka.

Neighbouring gminas
Gmina Hrubieszów is bordered by the town of Hrubieszów and by the gminas of Białopole, Horodło, Mircze, Trzeszczany, Uchanie and Werbkowice. It also borders Ukraine.

References

Polish official population figures 2006

Hrubieszow
Hrubieszów County